Masayoshi Ogawa (2 December 1894 – 7 January 1977) was a Japanese lawyer and director of the Karafuto Agency (1940–1943). He was Governor of Aomori Prefecture (1936–1939) and Mie Prefecture (1939–1940). He was also a member of the Government-General of Taiwan.

1894 births
1977 deaths
Governors of Aomori Prefecture
Governors of Mie Prefecture
Directors of the Karafuto Agency
20th-century Japanese lawyers
Japanese Police Bureau government officials
Japanese Home Ministry government officials
Members of the Government-General of Taiwan
University of Tokyo alumni
People from Yamaguchi Prefecture